Edward Isidore Feinberg (September 29, 1917 – April 20, 1986) was a Major League Baseball player who played for the Philadelphia Phillies in  and . He was Jewish, and his parents were Ukrainian Jews who emigrated to the United States. He was born in Philadelphia and graduated from South Philadelphia High School.

References

External links 

1917 births
1986 deaths
Philadelphia Phillies players
Major League Baseball shortstops
Major League Baseball second basemen
Major League Baseball outfielders
Baseball players from Pennsylvania
American people of Ukrainian-Jewish descent
Jewish American baseball players
Jewish Major League Baseball players
20th-century American Jews
Baseball players from Philadelphia
South Philadelphia High School alumni